Rambha is a town and a notified area council in Ganjam district in the Indian state of Odisha.

Geography
It has an average elevation of 87 metres (285 feet).

Demographics
 India census, Rambha had a population of 10,715. Males constitute 50% of the population and females 50%. Rambha has an average literacy rate of 56%, lower than the national average of 59.5%: male literacy is 69%, and female literacy is 44%. In Rambha, 15% of the population is under 6 years of age.

Climate and regional setting
Maximum summer temperature is 37 °C; minimum winter temperature is 17 °C. The mean daily temperature varies from 33 °C to 38 °C. May is the hottest month; December is the coldest. The average annual rainfall is 1250 mm and the region receives monsoon and torrential rainfall from July to October.

References

External links

Cities and towns in Ganjam district